Debbie Austin (born February 1, 1948) is an American professional golfer. 

Austin was born in Oneida, New York. She first played on the LPGA Tour in 1968 and went on to win seven tournaments, including five in 1977 when she tied with Judy Rankin for most on tour. She was named Player of the Year in 1977 by Golf Magazine.

She won the Wills Qantas Australian Ladies Open in 1978. A recurring tendonitis problem plagued her during 1979 and 1980, but she returned to winning form in 1981 by winning the Mayflower Classic. With that victory, she established the tradition of the winner taking a plunge into the pool with General Chairman John B. Smith.

She has held a variety of positions since the end of her tour career, including a stint as a coach for the Rollins College ladies' golf team in Winter Park, Florida. She spent several years associated with Westchester Country Club in New York. She resides in Orlando, Florida and is the former head coach of the Bishop Moore Catholic High School girls' golf team. She is now retired but plays regularly at her home course, Orange Tree Golf Club.

The junior tees at Westchester Country Club are named after her.

Professional wins (8)

LPGA Tour wins (7)

Other wins (1)
1978 Wills Qantas Australian Ladies Open

References

External links

American female golfers
Rollins Tars women's golfers
LPGA Tour golfers
College golf coaches in the United States
Golfers from New York (state)
Golfers from Orlando, Florida
People from Oneida, New York
1948 births
Living people